The music for the 2013 action-adventure survival horror video game The Last of Us, developed by Naughty Dog and published by Sony Computer Entertainment, was composed by musician Gustavo Santaolalla. Supplementary music for the game's downloadable content The Last of Us: Left Behind was composed by Santaolalla, Andrew Buresh, Anthony Caruso and Jonathan Mayer. Both soundtracks were produced by Santaolalla, Mayer, and Aníbal Kerpel, with separate segments recorded in both Los Angeles and Nashville. Santaolalla, known for his minimalist approach to composing, was excited to work on the soundtrack due to the game's focus on the characters and story. He began composing the music early in the game's development, with few instructions from the development team on the tone that they intended. In collaboration with each other, the team and Santaolalla aimed to make the soundtrack emotional, as opposed to scary. Santaolalla used various instruments to compose the score, including some that were unfamiliar to him.

The soundtrack album for The Last of Us was released on iTunes in June 2013. Additional compositions, including some composed for Left Behind, were released on a second soundtrack in February 2014. Critical reception to the soundtracks was positive, as reviewers felt that the music connected appropriately with the gameplay. In particular, critics felt that the minimalist approach of the soundtrack's composition matched the gameplay. The game's music was nominated for numerous awards. Several tracks became popular and begot cover versions and live performances.

Production and composition 

During the initial development of The Last of Us, creative director Neil Druckmann and game director Bruce Straley compiled musical tracks that they found inspirational. When searching for a composer to work on the game's music, they realised that Gustavo Santaolalla composed many of their compiled tracks. Straley described Santaolalla's music as "organic instrumentation, minimalist, dissonance and resonance with the sounds". The composer agreed to work on the game's soundtrack when contacted by Sony. After hearing the game's pitch, Santaolalla was excited to work on the game; he had previously wanted to compose for video games, but refused to work on those without a focus on story and characters.

Santaolalla began work on The Last of Us early in its development. Druckmann did not give him specific directions but offered him the game's stories and themes. Santaolalla appreciated this freedom and felt it assisted his process. He felt the need to "go into some more dark place, more textural and not necessarily melodic", when composing. The composer prefers to compose as he records, as he has little knowledge of reading and writing sheet music. To challenge himself, Santaolalla used a variety of unique instruments that were new to him, giving "an element of danger and innocence". For some tracks, he used a detuned guitar, producing deep noise. To produce unique sounds, Santaolalla recorded in various rooms, including a bathroom and kitchen. The title track was composed on a variety of charango called a ronroco. The team wanted the game's AI to affect the music. They also tried to make the music evoke a reaction from the player, as their familiarization with the sounds would trigger a previous emotion that they felt. Music manager Jonathan Mayer felt that the game's action music was atypical for video game action music, stating that it is "relatively low-key", and that taking it out of context changes the immediate reaction to it. The game's theme, "The Last of Us", was the first piece of music that the team received, and they were very impressed. With the music, the team aimed to "get emotion", as opposed to "horror". Inspired by the sparing use of music in the film No Country for Old Men (2007), the team used music judiciously and tried to find other ways to "make your palms sweaty". The orchestral portions of the score were recorded at Ocean Way Studios in Nashville by the Nashville Scoring Orchestra.

Aside from the official soundtracks, licensed tracks also appear in the game. In the main game, during the section titled "Alone and Forsaken", Joel and Ellie listen to the songs "I'll Never Get Out of This World Alive" and "Alone and Forsaken", both by Hank Williams. In the downloadable expansion pack The Last of Us: Left Behind, Ellie and Riley dance to the Etta James cover of the song "I Got You Babe". In addition, "String Quartet No. 3 in E-Flat Minor, Op. 30" by Pyotr Ilyich Tchaikovsky and "String Quartet No. 4 in E-Minor (B.19)" by Antonín Dvořák are also present in Left Behind.

Albums

The Last of Us 

The soundtrack for The Last of Us comprises songs from the game, composed and produced by Gustavo Santaolalla. The soundtrack spans thirty tracks, covering a duration of 56 minutes. Sony Computer Entertainment first published the album digitally via iTunes on June 7, 2013, and physically on June 13, 2013. The soundtrack was also included as pre-order downloadable content in the Sights and Sounds Pack.

The orchestral score, performed by the Nashville Scoring Orchestra, was recorded at Ocean Way Studios in Nashville, while the soundtrack's drums and percussion, performed by Santaolalla, M.B. Gordy and Jonathan Mayer, was recorded at EastWest Studios in Hollywood. All recording was done by Mark Senasac and Aníbal Kerpel. The soundtrack was mastered by Tom Baker at Precision Mastering in Los Angeles.

In the context of the game, the soundtrack was well received. Andy Kelly of Computer and Video Games felt that the score is "sparse and delicate"; Eurogamers Oli Welsh echoed these statements, adding that the music complements the game's environments. Jim Sterling of Destructoid also praised the music's ability to complement gameplay. Matt Helgeson of Game Informer praised Santaolalla's work, calling it "understated and haunting". Chris Kerr of Side One felt that the soundtrack was "the perfect companion" to the game, stating that it is "poignant, moving, and overflowing with desolate hope". Similarly, Keri Honea of Game Revolution felt that the album can be "easily enjoy[ed] outside of the game", praising its unusual tracks and sound. GameSpots Tom Mc Shea named the music as one of the game's standout features, calling it "exceptional" and praising its addition during emotional scenes. Thom Jurek of AllMusic praised the album's variety, stating that Santaolalla manages to "draw in and keep the attention of the listener."

The Last of Us Volume 2 

The Last of Us Volume 2, the soundtrack for the downloadable content The Last of Us: Left Behind, features compositions from the game, composed and produced by Gustavo Santaolalla. It also features works from Andrew Buresh, Anthony Caruso, and Jonathan Mayer, as well as some additional tracks from the main game. The soundtrack spans 25 tracks, covering a duration of 58 minutes. Sony Computer Entertainment first published the album on iTunes and Amazon Music on February 7, 2014, one week prior to the release of Left Behind.

The recording and mastering of the soundtrack took place in the same locations as the first album. The orchestral score, performed by the Nashville Scoring Orchestra, was recorded at Ocean Way Studios in Nashville, while the soundtrack's drums and percussion, performed by M.B. Gordy, Santaolalla and Mayer, was recorded at EastWest Studios in Hollywood. All recording and mixing was completed by Aníbal Kerpel, with additional mixing by Mark Senasac, Joel Yarger, Mayer and Caruso. The soundtrack was mastered by Marc Senasac at PlayStation Recording Studios.

In the context of the game, the soundtrack was generally well received. Mike Futter of Game Informer felt that the soundtrack improves the game. Adnan Riaz of Nouse echoed similar remarks, stating that the soundtrack accompanies some of the game's "crucial moments", and that it "builds the atmosphere for the exchanges" between the characters.

Legacy 
The Last of Us won Excellence in Musical Score at the 2014 SXSW Gaming Awards, and the soundtrack received nominations at the 10th British Academy Video Games Awards and Spike VGX 2013, and from Hardcore Gamer, IGN and GameTrailers. The game's main theme was performed live at the 2012 Spike Video Game Awards in Culver City, California on December 7, 2012. Music from The Last of Us was also performed live at The Last of Us: One Night Live in Santa Monica, California on July 28, 2014. The event featured scenes from the game performed live by the actors, accompanied by the game's score, performed by Santaolalla and his band. The popularity of the game has led to numerous cover versions of the music being released by various artists, such as violinist Taylor Davis, guitarist Igor Presnyakov and musician Ben "Squid Physics" Morfitt.

References

External links 
 

Last of Us, The
Last of Us Volume 2, The
Albums produced by Gustavo Santaolalla
The Last of Us
Last of Us, The
Last of Us, The